"The Princess and the Queen" is the sixth episode of the first season of the HBO fantasy drama television series House of the Dragon. The episode is named after George R. R. Martin's eponymous 2013 novella. Written by Sara Hess and directed by Miguel Sapochnik, it first aired on September 25, 2022.

The episode features a 10-year time jump after the previous episode and depicts the birth of Rhaenyra and Laenor's third son Joffrey; Daemon, Laena, and their daughters Baela and Rhaena's visit to Pentos; and allegation surrounding Rhaenyra and Laenor's sons as bastards.

It received mostly positive reviews, with praise going towards the opening scene, Laena's death scene, the climactic sequence at Harrenhal, and the performances of Olivia Cooke, Emma D'Arcy, and Nanna Blondell, though some criticized the pacing, particularly for causing emotional scenes to fall short.

Plot
Ten years after marrying Ser  Laenor Velaryon, Princess Rhaenyra gives birth to a third child. Queen Alicent immediately summons the infant. A weakened Rhaenyra brings the newborn herself, assisted by Laenor, who names him Joffrey. Alicent notes the child, like brothers Jacaerys and Lucerys, bears no resemblance to Laenor. Alicent privately insists that Rhaenyra's children are bastards, an allegation King Viserys ignores.

Alicent's son Aegon, aided by Jacaerys and Lucerys, pranks his younger brother, Aemond, who as yet has no dragon. Alicent scolds Aegon for misbehaving and stresses family unity, saying he will one day fight Rhaenyra for the throne.

Ser Criston, now Alicent's protector and ally, trains the young princes in swordsmanship. Ser Criston taunts City Watch commander Ser Harwin Strong over his protecting Jacaerys like he was his own child, provoking Harwin to attack Criston. Lord Lyonel Strong later chastises his son Harwin's behavior, stressing it substantiates rumours about Rhaenyra's infidelity with Harwin and damages the children's legitimacy. Amid the political turmoil, Rhaenyra denies Laenor's request to fight the Triarchy. To ease family tensions, Rhaenyra proposes that Prince Jacaerys marry Helaena, Alicent's daughter. Viserys approves, while Alicent disapproves. 

The rumours cause Lord Strong to offer his resignation as Hand of the King, which Viserys rejects. Viserys allows Lord Strong to escort the disgraced Harwin back to Harrenhal. After Harwin bids an emotional farewell to Rhaenyra and her children, Jacaerys asks if Harwin is his biological father; Rhaenyra replies that Jacaerys is a Targaryen. Reading the political winds, Rhaenyra moves her household to Dragonstone, also bringing Laenor's lover, Ser Qarl Correy.

Alicent mentions to Harwin's brother, Larys Strong, that she wishes her father, Ser Otto, was still the king's Hand. To that purpose, Larys recruits three condemned criminals, has their tongues removed, and tasks them to set a fire at Harrenhal, killing Lord Strong and Ser Harwin.

Meanwhile, Prince Daemon and his wife, Laena Velaryon, visit Pentos with their daughters Baela and Rhaena. Prince Reggio Haratis offers them lands in exchange for an alliance against the resurgent Triarchy. The pregnant Laena suffers prolonged labor and is unable to deliver; she commands her dragon Vhagar to incinerate her to die a dragonrider's death.

Production

Writing 
"The Princess and the Queen" was written by executive producer Sara Hess, marking her first time in the Game of Thrones franchise. 

The title of the episode is named after George R. R. Martin's eponymous 2013 novella.

Filming 
The episode was directed by showrunner and executive producer Miguel Sapochnik, making it his second directorial credit for the series, following the pilot episode "The Heirs of the Dragon", and eighth for the overall franchise.

La Calahorra, a municipality in eastern Granada, Spain, served as the location for the scenes in Pentos.

Casting 

The episode stars Paddy Considine, Matt Smith, Olivia Cooke, Emma D'Arcy, Fabien Frankel, Graham McTavish, Matthew Needham, and Jefferson Hall. Rhys Ifans is credited but does not appear.

It marks the first appearance of D'Arcy as adult Rhaenyra Targaryen, Cooke as adult Alicent Hightower, and John Macmillan as adult Laenor Velaryon, succeeding Milly Alcock, Emily Carey and Theo Nate who portrayed the young version of the three characters, respectively, following a plot jump of 10 years after the previous episode. D'Arcy was previously credited in the pilot episode as the narrator of the opening scene, therefore, this episode marks their first on-screen appearance.

Also introduced in the episode were Ty Tennant, Leo Ashton and Evie Allen as the young versions of Viserys and Alicent's children Aegon, Aemond and Helaena, respectively; Leo Hart and Harvey Sadler as the young versions of Rhaenyra and Laenor's first two sons Jacaerys and Lucerys, respectively; as well as Shani Smethurst and Eva Ossei-Gerning as the young versions of Daemon and Laena's daughters Baela and Rhaena. Additionally, it also marks the first and only appearance of Nanna Blondell as adult Laena Velaryon, succeeding Savannah Steyn who portrayed the teenage Laena in the previous episode; and the final appearance of Gavin Spokes as Lord Lyonel Strong and Ryan Corr as Ser Harwin Strong.

Reception

Ratings
An estimated 1.86 million viewers watched "The Princess and the Queen" during its first broadcast on HBO. A total of 2.48 million viewers watched the episode across its four broadcasts on HBO during the premiere night. Its viewership on all platforms in the US meanwhile was 3% more than the previous episode.

Critical response
The episode received mostly positive reviews. On the review aggregator Rotten Tomatoes, it holds an approval rating of 86% based on 103 reviews, with an average rating of 7.5/10. The site's critical consensus said, "While the longest time-skip yet diminishes some of this installment's most shocking moments, the commanding introductions of Emma D'Arcy and Olivia Cooke make clear that 'The Princess and the Queen' will remain compulsively watchable combatants." 

Writing for Den of Geek, Alec Bojalad gave it a rating of 4.5 out of 5 stars and deemed it "by far the most entertaining and enriching dispatch from House of the Dragon yet." He highlighted the opening scene, calling it "the best thing the show has done yet" and praising the performances of D'Arcy, Cooke and Mcmillan. Reviewing for IGN, Helen O'Hara gave it a "great" score of 8 out of 10 and wrote in her verdict: "Plotting, mutilation, murder, and dragons: it doesn't get much more Game Of Thrones than this. It's also a dramatically compelling episode, with lots of spiky moments to reassure us that Rhaenyra and Alicent are in good hands. If a few moments still feel shaky in the writing, there's no doubt that the cast are doing their utmost." Molly Edwards of GamesRadar+ rated the episode with 3 out of 5 stars and summarized her review by saying, "The new Rhaenyra and Alicent are strong additions to the cast, but the episode flies through major events so quickly that emotional weight is lost." She then praised the visuals and Blondell's performance as Laena, calling it "powerful", but criticized the episode's pacing.

References

External links
 "The Princess and the Queen" at HBO
 

2022 American television episodes
Fratricide in fiction
House of the Dragon episodes
Patricide in fiction
Television episodes directed by Miguel Sapochnik